Margaret Darling Woodbridge (January 6, 1902 – February 23, 1995), also known by her married name Margaret Presley, was an American competition swimmer, Olympic champion, and world record-holder.

She represented the United States at the 1920 Summer Olympics in Antwerp, Belgium.  She won the gold medal as member of the winning U.S. team in the women's 4×100-meter freestyle relay.  Woodbridge and her American relay teammates Frances Schroth, Irene Guest and Ethelda Bleibtrey set a new world record of 5:11.6 in the event final.  Individually, Woodbridge received a silver medal for her second-place performance in the women's 300-meter freestyle, finishing behind American teammate Ethelda Bleibtrey, in a time of 4:42.8.

Woodbridge was inducted into the International Swimming Hall of Fame as an "Honor Pioneer Swimmer" in 1989.

See also
 List of members of the International Swimming Hall of Fame
 List of Olympic medalists in swimming (women)
 World record progression 4 × 100 metres freestyle relay

References

External links
 
 

1902 births
1995 deaths
American female freestyle swimmers
World record setters in swimming
Medalists at the 1920 Summer Olympics
Olympic gold medalists for the United States in swimming
Olympic silver medalists for the United States in swimming
Swimmers from Detroit
Swimmers at the 1920 Summer Olympics
20th-century American women